The Leeds municipal elections were held on Thursday 12 May 1955, with one third of the council up for election, as well as a vacancy in Wellington.

With the third consecutive election producing swings to them - this time a 2.1% swing - the Conservatives managed to top the poll and make gains from Labour for the first time since the 1951 election, echoing their national result. This, however, did not stop Labour winning a comfortable majority of the seats contested. The three gains were in Beeston, Westfield and Wortley - wards where Labour had gained from them following 1951. Party totals remained unchanged with the new division of aldermen effectively wiping out those three gains, as Labour were allotted - at Conservative expense - three more aldermen. Turnout rose marginally to a low figure of 39.4%.

Election result

The result had the following consequences for the total number of seats on the council after the elections:

Ward results

References

Leeds City Council election
1955
City Council election, 1955
Leeds City Council election